Truscott is an unincorporated community in Knox County, Texas, United States. According to the Handbook of Texas, the community had an estimated population of 50.

It is located at  (33.7542544, -99.8112042), along FM 1756 in north central Knox County, approximately 100 miles north of Abilene.

The community was settled in the 1880s and was named after J.J. Truscott, a local pioneer. The population peaked at around 500 in 1940 and declined thereafter.

Public education in the community of Truscott is provided by the Crowell Independent School District.

References

External links

Unincorporated communities in Texas
Unincorporated communities in Knox County, Texas
Populated places established in the 1880s